The Traitor is a 1957 British drama film directed by Michael McCarthy and starring Donald Wolfit, Robert Bray, Jane Griffiths and Anton Diffring.

Premise
A former resistance fighter tries to discover the traitor who has betrayed his colleagues in the German resistance during the Second World War.

Cast
 Donald Wolfit as Colonel Charles Price
 Robert Bray as Major Shane
 Jane Griffiths as Vicki Toller
 Carl Jaffe as Professor Stefan Toller
 Anton Diffring as Joseph Brezina
 Christopher Lee as Doctor Neumann
 Oscar Quitak as Thomas Rilke
 Karel Štěpánek as Mayor Friederich Suderman
 Frederick Schiller as Alfred Baum
 Rupert Davies as Clinton, the butler
 John Van Eyssen as Lieutenant Bobby Grant
 Colin Croft as Theodore Dehmel

Theme music
The film's title music, "Prelude Without A Name", and incidental music were written and conducted by Jackie Brown. The solo pianist was Dennis Wilson.

Critical reception
Sky Movieswrote, "The specially written musical piece, Prelude, which has a vital part to play in the plot's unfolding, is hauntingly appealing. But too much talk tends to spoil the script's surprises." The Radio Times noted, "Nuance was not Donald Wolfit's strong suit, but he had presence and power in spades. He totally dominates this story with a bluster and conviction that keeps an uninspiring tale of the hunt for a Second World War traitor from falling flat on its face." TV Guide concluded, "This is an offbeat espionage whodunit with some nervy moments."

Around the film
 On a very similar plot line, the French filmmaker Julien Duvivier directed in 1959 Marie-Octobre, also known as Secret Meeting, starring Danielle Darrieux and based on a novel by Jacques Robert published in 1948.

References

Bibliography
 Chibnall, Steve & McFarlane, Brian. The British 'B' Film. Palgrave MacMillan, 2009.

External links

1957 films
British drama films
1957 drama films
Films directed by Michael McCarthy
Films set in England
1950s English-language films
1950s British films